Mohamed Ali Abdel Jalil, Syrian essayist, calligraph, critic, researcher islamologist and translator, French and Arabic-speaking, born in Damascus in 1973 in a peasant family from Damascus Suburb (Rif Dimashq Governorate) (village: Rankous). He studied at the Damascus University. He is a member of the Maaber Committee (The magazine and Publishing houseof Maaber http://www.maaber.org/). He proposes the idea that the Qur'an is a text translated into Arabic from other dominant languages and cultures.

Articles 

 Athar fi al-'aqida thakhalluf wa'i al-mu'taqidiin (The impact of dogma in the regression of the consciousness of believers);
 Ibn Sina wa mas'alat at-taqammus (Avicenna and the question of reincarnation);
 Masadir al-wahm (Sources of illusion);
 Imtilak al-Hakiki (Possession of the truth);
 Influenza al-da'wa (Influenza of proselytism)
 Notes on the concept of jihad (Magazine Maaber Maaber)
 Kalaam Alllah (The Word of God)
 Haqiqat an-nabi حقيقة النبي (article)
  "وظيفة القرآن" ("The function of the Koran"): The article on SSRCAW (Secular Studies & Researches Centre in Arabic World) and the article on al-Hewar.

Translated works 

 Qaamus al-la'unf (Dictionary of non-violence), Jean-Marie MULLER Jean-Marie Muller;
 Al-la'unf fi at-tarbiya (Non-violence in education), Jean-Marie Muller;
 Mukhtarat Simone Weil (Simone Weil, Anthology);
 Al-tajazzur (The Need for Roots: prelude towards a declaration of duties towards mankind), Simone Weil.
 Gandhi al-mutamarrid غاندي المتمرد

References 
 interview with the author on non-violence in Maaber
 Blog of the author
 IREMAM (Institut de recherches et d'études sur le monde arabe et musulman): Carnets de l'IREMAM
 The website al-hewar al mutamaddi
TheWebsite of Maaber Magazine: http://www.maaber.org/indexa/al_dalil_ein.htm#abduljalil_ali
The website of Arab Club: sbhhbs.ahlamontada.net/t1520-topic
 Damascus University
 His Blog on Alwah
The website of Tawasul On Line: http://www.tawasolonline.net/AuthorDetails.aspx?AuthorId=387
Lebanese Association for Civil Rights in cooperation with the Spanish Foundation of NOVA (Publishing of the translation of Dictionary of Non-violence written by Jean Marie Muller)
 Medarat website

1973 births
French–Arabic translators
Living people
Syrian essayists
20th-century Syrian writers
Writers from Damascus